Desperados is a real-time tactics video game series originally developed by Spellbound Entertainment, the series was then acquired by THQ Nordic on 24 June 2013. The series is set in the 1880s Midwest, its main protagonist John Cooper deals with living the life of a cowboy, often coming to blows with other criminals and bandits as he struggles to make a living as an outlaw. The series gameplay revolves around stealth with players having the option to take out enemies one by one or going in guns blazing, either by controlling John or numerous other player characters that help John along the way.

Games

Desperados: Wanted Dead or Alive (2001)

Desperados 2: Cooper's Revenge (2006)

Helldorado (2007)

Desperados III (2020)

References

External links
 

Desperados (video game series)
Embracer Group franchises
Video game franchises
Video game franchises introduced in 2001